Christmas in Wonderland is a 2007 comedy film about three children who move with their father from Los Angeles to Edmonton, Alberta, where they catch a group of counterfeiters while Christmas shopping.

Plot
The Saunders family has just moved from Los Angeles to Edmonton right before Christmas leaving them with no Christmas spirit with the exception of the bright eyed 6-year-old Mary. They go to the majestic West Edmonton Mall for Christmas shopping. 16-year-old Danny and 12-year-old Brian find out that their father, Wayne, had been fired from his job and Christmas might not happen this year. He leaves Danny in charge of Brian and Mary. Mary tells Santa that she wants a million dollars for Christmas for Wayne, although she doesn't know he was fired. She also says the same thing to "Rudolph" the reindeer and Brian tells her that if she wanders off again, the "Mall Ghost" will eat her. They then go to the ice rink.

Meanwhile, Leonard and Sheldon Cardoza are talking about using counterfeit money to get real money in exchange. In an argument, Leonard accidentally knocks it off the ledge and onto the ice rink. Brian and Mary find it and not knowing that it's counterfeit money, leave to go on a shopping spree. Mary thinks Santa gave it to her as an early present. Ginger Peachum goes to Leonard and Sheldon and gets mad at them for losing it. They go to the ice rink to find Brian and Mary, but they have already left. They buy a motorcycle while Wayne is having a tough time buying a gift for his wife, Judy, who is still in Los Angeles after getting bumped. In the backroom, Gordon McLoosh from the RCMP comes to investigate the case of how counterfeit money is appearing all over the mall with the story of two kids claiming that they won the lottery. They find the address where they want the motorcycle to be delivered. They go there and, seeing all the unpacked boxes everywhere, think they are going to move (which is odd, considering they just got there). They find a family photo and use it as evidence. They then search the mall for Wayne, thinking he is the one behind all the counterfeit money.

Brian and Mary are spending the counterfeit money, Wayne is having troubles buying a gift for Judy, Danny can't find Brian or Mary at Santa's Village, and Leonard and Sheldon are looking for them. However, he goes to the amusement park to find them and finally meets the girl from the water park, who invites him to some Booster Juice. They learn they have everything in common such as both being from Los Angeles, both hating Edmonton, her name is Shane (which was his girlfriend's name in Los Angeles), and missing younger siblings. At LAX Airport, Judy is stuck waiting for her plane. There, she meets Kristopher Kringle who informs her that he got bumped too and that she shouldn't worry because "things always work themselves out one way or another". He then leaves to board his plane and shocks her after he knows her name.

After leaving the bar, Wayne gets arrested by Gordon, but he explains that he is innocent. Brian and Mary witness this and after he explains what happened to them, Leonard and Sheldon finally catch up to and chase them. They bump into Ginger, but Brian finds out that Leonard and Sheldon work for her and run away again. Elsewhere, Wayne is getting interrogated but still has no idea what is going on. Just when they find out that the money is counterfeit, mall security bring Leonard and Sheldon to Gordon. The Saunders family gets released and Wayne is very upset at Danny for accidentally leaving Brian and Mary at Santa's Village. On their way out, they walk into Sam Nichols, who owns the mall. He says that he is willing to give Wayne a job. At home, they forgot about getting a tree, presents, or anything. The next morning, Judy is able to get home before Christmas and the kids marvel as they see a tree and presents. The turkey is even ready. Mary gets a letter from Santa saying that he is the one responsible for everything.

Cast

Production
The film is largely set and mostly filmed in West Edmonton Mall. Secrecy before it was announced led many Edmontonians to wonder why Christmas decorations were still in place long after Christmas had passed.

Release
The film was exhibited theatrically in Canada in 2007, but it premiered on television in the United States in 2008 as part of ABC Family's 25 Days of Christmas programming block. It was poorly received by the public.

See also 
 List of Christmas films

References

External links
 
 

2007 films
2007 comedy films
2000s children's comedy films
ABC Family original films
American children's comedy films
American Christmas comedy films
Canadian children's comedy films
Canadian Christmas comedy films
English-language Canadian films
2000s English-language films
Films set in Edmonton
Films shot in Edmonton
2000s Christmas comedy films
Films directed by James Orr (filmmaker)
2000s American films
2000s Canadian films